Silke Hornillos Klein better known as Silke (born 6 February 1974) is a Spanish actress. She has appeared in more than twenty films since 1992.

Selected filmography

References

External links
 

1974 births
Living people
Actresses from Madrid
Spanish film actresses
20th-century Spanish actresses
21st-century Spanish actresses